Tulabi Baraftab (also Romanized as Tūlābī Barāftāb; also known as Dūsh-e Barāftāb and Dom Dūsh-e Barāftāb) is a village in Teshkan Rural District, Chegeni District, Dowreh County, Lorestan Province, Iran. At the 2006 census, its population was 338, in 64 families.

References 

Towns and villages in Dowreh County